Morassa (also Romanized as Moraşşa‘; also known as Murāseh and Muraza) is a village in Bughda Kandi Rural District, in the Central District of Zanjan County, Zanjan Province, Iran. At the 2006 census, its population was 623, in 126 families.

References 

Populated places in Zanjan County